Bailleul-Sir-Berthoult is a commune in the Pas-de-Calais department in the Hauts-de-France region of France.

Geography
A farming village located 5 miles (8 km) northeast of Arras at the junction of the D49 and D919 roads.

Population

Sights
 The church of St. Jean-Baptiste, rebuilt after 1918, along with the rest of the village.
 The British Commonwealth cemetery.

See also
Communes of the Pas-de-Calais department

References

External links

 The CWGC war cemetery

Communes of Pas-de-Calais